The Toiling of Idle Hands, is the 2003 moniker-free, solo release from John Tejada.

Track listing
"Sound Of Possibility" – 5:25
"Tethered" – 5:05
"Beautiful Confusion" – 5:04
"Dividing Each Existence" – 4:59
"The Pavement View" – 4:55
"Mating Rhythm" – 5:11
"Mental Jukebox" – 5:12
"Electric Whipcrack" – 5:11
"Thoughts In Chains" – 5:12
"A Fading Memory" – 5:23

Reception 

2003 albums
John Tejada albums